Cornus hemsleyi is a species of dogwood found in  Gansu, Guizhou, Hebei, Henan, Hubei, Qinghai, Shaanxi, Shanxi, Sichuan, Xizang, Yunnan provinces of China at elevations of 1000–4000 meters.

References

External links
 
 
 

hemsleyi